Joseph Oscar Nii Armah Mettle, recognised by his stage name Joe Mettle, is a Ghanaian gospel singer and songwriter. On April 8, 2017, he made history by being the first Gospel musician to win the coveted Artist of the year award at the 2017 Ghana Music Awards. He has won many awards in Ghana and beyond, and has performed on international stages with International Gospel Artistes like Donnie McClurkin, Nathaniel Bassey, Ntokozo Mbambo, Michael Stuckey and many more. He is married to Selassie Mettle (née Dzisa).

Early life and education 
Joe, although a marketer by profession, is a worshiper by calling. He was born to Florence Addo and Emmanuel Mettle and is the eldest of six children. Joe started his education at the Richard Akwei Memorial School and later moved to Kade 1&2 Primary School (Kade) where he spent about a year before returning to Accra, to the St. Michael's and All Angels. He continued to Korle Gonno 3 Junior High School (JHS) and obtained his Senior High School Certificate from the His Majesty Academy. Joe Mettle is an alumnus of Accra Academy. Prior to His Majesty Academy, he studied draftsmanship at the Modern School of Draftsmanship (MODESCO). He then attended the Pentecost University College, a private Christian university college located at Sowutuom in Accra.

Music career 
During his early days of singing, he worked as a backing vocalist for some Ghanaian Gospel greats including Cindy Thompson, the late Danny Nettey, and Reverend Tom Bright Davies. Joe Mettle was the lead singer for the indigenous multicultural music group, Soul Winners. He won the Artiste of the Year, Gospel Artiste of the Year and the Male Vocalist Artiste of the Year at the 2017 Vodafone Ghana Music Awards (VGMA). His award for Artiste of the Year was considered historical as he was the first Gospel artiste to win in this category since the conception of these awards. Joe has also won over 10 local and international awards. He has won several awards at Africa Gospel Music Awards, Gospel industry Awards, African Gospel Awards (UK), CCML Ghana Gospel Awards, Bass Awards and RIGA Awards (South Africa).

Joe has featured on the popular South African Broadcasting Corporation's TV show titled, "Gospel Classics" which also highlighted Donnie McClurkin. He received the Best Male Gospel Artiste in Africa at the Trumpet Gospel Awards held in South Africa.

He has many nationwide hit songs including "Mehia wo Yesu" (meaning-I need you Jesus), "Nhyira" (meaning-Blessing), "Medɔ Wo", "Akokyem Nyame", "Mensuro" (meaning-I will not fear), "Turning Around" and "Yesu Adi Nkunim" (meaning-Christ is Victorious) to his credit. One of the songs attributed to him, that won him nominations at the 2017 VGMA is titled "Ɔnwanwani" (meaning-God of Wonders). He has six albums to his credit.

Joe Mettle Ministries 
In 2007, Joe Mettle Ministries was founded. The Ministry has two major annual headline events; Praiz Reloaded, midyear and Lovegift in December every year.

Joe is the manager at Reverb Studios, which is a rehearsal and recording studio in Accra. The company provides musical equipment rental, as well as music and marketing consultancy services.

Personal life 

Joe married Salomey Selassie Dzisa in a traditional marriage ceremony in Accra (13 August 2020), and followed with an official wedding ceremony in Tema (15 August 2020).

Awards and nominations

Discography

Albums

Singles 
 "Medɔ Wo" (meaning "I Love You")
 "Sound of Praise"
 "Saved with Amazing Grace" (S.W.A.G.)
 "Ɔnwanwani" (meaning - God of Wonders)
 "Bo Nɔɔ Ni" (meaning "No One Else")
 "My Everything"
 "Ye Obua Mi"
 "Yesu Mo"

References

External links
 Official Facebook Page

Living people
21st-century Ghanaian male singers
Year of birth missing (living people)
Ghanaian gospel singers